Boiardi is an Italian surname.

People with this surname include:

People
 Amedeo Boiardi, Italian politician, early-1990s former President of the Province of Massa and Carrara
 Anna Boiardi, grandniece of Hector Boyardee, star of reality show Playing with Fire (2013 TV series)
 Carlo Boiardi, mid-20th-century Roman Catholic Bishop of Apuania, see Roman Catholic Diocese of Massa Carrara-Pontremoli
 Ettore Boiardi (1897-1985; anglicized as: Hector Boyardee), the Chef Boy-Ar-Dee, Italian chef and Italian-American food entrepreneur
 George Boiardi, a midfielder lacrosse player, see List of Premier Lacrosse League awards
 Gian Luigi Boiardi (1951-2018), Italian politician
 Anthony Boiardi, Step son of Mario Boiardi businessman, economic adviser, Oil consultant, foreign trade negotiator.

Fictional characters
 Geoffrey Boiardi (character), a fictional character from the 2001 romcom film The Next Big Thing (film)

See also

 
 Boiardo (surname), an Italian surname
 Bojardi (surname), an Italian surname
 George Boiardi Short Stick Midfielder of the Year, a Premier Lacrosse League award, see List of Premier Lacrosse League awards
 Chef Boyardee, an Italian food brand created by Ettore Boiardi, now a ConAgra Foods brand

References

Boiardi
Surnames